Soutelphan or Sawt el Fan is an Egyptian recording company founded in 1961, by Mohamed Abdel Wahab, Magdi el-Amroussi and Abdel Halim Hafez (1929–77). It is distributed by Universal Music MENA, and recording artists include Abdel Halim Hafez and Ahmid Adewayah.

References

1961 establishments in Egypt
Arab record labels
Egyptian record labels
EMI